Rodney Jamel Omar Trott (born 8 September 1987) is a Bermudian cricketer.

A right-handed batsman and a right-arm off-break bowler., he has played first-class and One Day International cricket for Bermuda. He made his first class debut in the 2006 ICC Intercontinental Cup against the Netherlands in November 2006.

In August 2008, Rodney Trott became the youngest ever captain in the history of T20I (at the age of 20 years and 332 days).

In August 2019, he was named in Bermuda's squad for the Regional Finals of the 2018–19 ICC T20 World Cup Americas Qualifier tournament. In September 2019, he was named in Bermuda's squad for the 2019 ICC T20 World Cup Qualifier tournament in the United Arab Emirates. In November 2019, he was named as the vice-captain of Bermuda's squad for the Cricket World Cup Challenge League B tournament in Oman.

In October 2021, he was named as the vice-captain of Bermuda's squad for the 2021 ICC Men's T20 World Cup Americas Qualifier tournament in Antigua.

References

External links

1987 births
Living people
Bermudian cricketers
Bermuda One Day International cricketers
Bermuda Twenty20 International cricketers